Barry Holstun Lopez (January 6, 1945 – December 25, 2020) was an American author, essayist, nature writer, and fiction writer whose work is known for its humanitarian and environmental concerns. In a career spanning over 50 years, he visited more than 80 countries, and wrote extensively about a variety of landscapes including the Arctic wilderness, exploring the relationship between human cultures and nature. He won the National Book Award for Nonfiction for Arctic Dreams (1986) and his Of Wolves and Men (1978) was a National Book Award finalist. He was a contributor to magazines including Harper's Magazine, National Geographic, and The Paris Review.

Early life
Lopez was born Barry Holstun Brennan on January 6, 1945, in Port Chester, New York, to Mary Frances (née Holstun) and John Brennan. His family moved to Reseda, California after the birth of his brother, Dennis, in 1948. He attended grade school at Our Lady of Grace during this time.  His parents divorced in 1950, after which his mother married Adrian Bernard Lopez, a businessman, in 1955. Adrian Lopez adopted Barry and his brother, and they both took his surname. Lopez experienced years of sexual abuse as the victim of a respected member of the community.

When Lopez was 11, his family relocated to Manhattan, where he attended the Loyola School, graduating in 1962. As a young man, Lopez considered becoming a Catholic priest or a Trappist monk before attending the University of Notre Dame, earning undergraduate and graduate degrees there in 1966 and 1968. He also attended New York University and the University of Oregon. Although he drifted away from Catholicism, daily prayer remained important to him as a continuous, respectful attendance to the presence of the Divine.

Career and works 
Lopez's essays, short stories, reviews and opinion pieces began to appear in 1966.  In his career of over 50 years, he traveled to over 80 countries, writing extensively about distant and exotic landscapes including the Arctic wilderness, exploring the relationships between human cultures and wild nature. Through his works, he also highlighted the harm caused by human actions on nature.  He was a contributing editor of Harper's Magazine and a contributor to many magazines including National Geographic, The Paris Review, and Outside. Until 1981, he was also a landscape photographer. In 2002, he was elected a fellow of The Explorers Club.

Arctic Dreams (1986) describes five years in the Canadian Arctic, where Lopez worked as a biologist. Robert Macfarlane, reviewing the book in The Guardian, describes him as "the most important living writer about wilderness". In The New York Times, Michiko Kakutani argued that Arctic Dreams "is a book about the Arctic North in the way that Moby-Dick is a novel about whales".

A number of Lopez's works, including Giving Birth to Thunder, Sleeping with His Daughter (1978), make use of Native American legends, including characters such as Coyote. Crow and Weasel (1990) thematizes the importance of metaphor, which Lopez described in an interview as one of the definitive "passion[s]" of humanity.

James I. McClintock describes Lopez as an admirer of Wendell Berry. McClintock further observes, referring to Arctic Dreams, that Lopez "conjoin[s] ecological science and romantic insight". Slovic identifies "careful structure, euphony, and an abundance of particular details" as central characteristics of Lopez's work.

His final work published during his lifetime was Horizon (2019), an autobiographical telling of his travels over his lifetime. The Guardian describes the book as "a contemporary epic, at once pained and urgent, personal and oracular".

An archive of Lopez's manuscripts and other work has been established at Texas Tech University, where he was the university's Visiting Distinguished Scholar. He also taught at universities including Columbia University, Eastern Washington University, University of Iowa, and Carleton College, Minnesota.

Bibliography

Fiction
 
 
 
  Distinguished Recognition Award, Friends of American Writers
  Parents' Choice Award
  Pacific Northwest Booksellers Association Award, Critics' Choice Award

Nonfiction
  National Book Award finalist, John Burroughs Medal, Christopher Medal, Pacific Northwest Booksellers Association Award
  National Book Award, National Book Critics Circle Award finalist
 
 
 
 
 
  Introduction by Rebecca Solnit.

Anthology

Edited volumes
 
 .

Awards and honors

National Book Award
 Award in Literature, American Academy of Arts and Letters
 Lannan Literary Award
 Guggenheim Fellowship
 John Burroughs Medal
 Two Pushcart Prizes
 National Science Foundation Fellowship
 MacDowell Colony Residency Fellowship
 Academy of Television Arts and Sciences Award
 Elected Fellow of the Explorers Club
 Doctor of Humane Letters from Whittier College

Personal life 
Lopez's first marriage to Sandra Landers in 1967 ended in a divorce in 1998. He married Debra Gwartney in 2007. After the property surrounding their long-term home near Finn Rock on the McKenzie River in western Oregon was burned in the 2020 Holiday Farm Fire, the couple moved temporarily to Eugene, Oregon.

Lopez died on December 25, 2020, from complications of prostate cancer, in Eugene, Oregon.

References

Sources

Further reading

External links

 
 
 
 Interview with Bill Moyers
 Interview with Terry Gross
Interview with Barry Lopez about the adaptation of Crow and Weasel for the Children's Theatre Company in Minneapolis, ALL ABOUT KIDS! TV Series #157 (1994)
Interview with Barry Lopez, A DISCUSSION WITH National Authors on Tour TV Series, Episode #34 (1993)
Interview with Barry Lopez, A DISCUSSION WITH National Authors on Tour TV Series, Episode #108 (1994)

1945 births
2020 deaths
American nature writers
American male non-fiction writers
Deaths from prostate cancer
Fellows of the Explorers Club
John Burroughs Medal recipients
National Book Award winners
New York University alumni
People from Lane County, Oregon
People from Port Chester, New York
University of Notre Dame alumni
University of Oregon alumni
Writers from New York (state)
Writers from Oregon
Deaths from cancer in Oregon